Gerard William Marshall (October 2, 1917 – June 8, 1994) was an American singer, bandleader and a motion picture actor, director and producer.

Biography
Born in Chicago, Illinois, Marshall became a vocalist for Fred Waring and his band, the "Pennsylvanians," before forming his own band in 1937. In 1940, he moved to Hollywood to act in films.

Some of the movies Marshall appeared in include Calendar Girl, That Brennan Girl, Belle of the Yukon, Knute Rockne, All American and State Fair (1945).

He was married three times. All his marriages were to actresses.
Michèle Morgan (1942–1948) —  son Michael Marshall, actor
Micheline Presle (1950–1954) —  daughter Tonie Marshall, film director
Ginger Rogers (1961–1969)

Marshall died in France in June 1994, at the age of 76.

See also 
 Les Impures (1954)
 Quick, Let's Get Married (1964)

References

External links

 
 

1917 births
1994 deaths
American bandleaders
American male film actors
Male actors from Chicago
20th-century American male actors
20th-century American musicians